B16 or B-16 may refer to:

 B16 (New York City bus) serving Brooklyn
 HLA-B16, an HLA - B serotype
 Honda B16 engine
 Volvo B16 engine
 LNER Class B16, a class of British steam locomotives
 Martin XB-16, a proposed bomber aircraft
 B16 Melanoma, a cell line
 Boron-16 (B-16 or 16B), an isotope of boron
 One of the ECO codes for the Caro–Kann Defence in chess
 Pope Benedict XVI
 Bundesstraße 16, federal highway in Germany
 16 amp, type B – a standard circuit breaker current rating